"Celebration" is a 1980 song by American band Kool & the Gang. Released as the first single from their twelfth album, Celebrate! (1980), it was the band's first and only single to reach No. 1 on the US Billboard Hot 100. 

In 2021, the Library of Congress selected "Celebration" for preservation in the National Recording Registry for being "culturally historically or aesthetically significant".

Origins
Co-founder Ronald Bell, the group's saxophonist and musical arranger, explained the origins of the song;

Composition
"Celebration" is in the key of A♭ in common time and was written as a collaboration by the whole band. The song moves at a tempo of 123 beats per minute. The group's vocals span from A3 to E5.

Critical reception
Record World said that "One big party hook with cool chorus chants & a boss bass."

Commercial performance
"Celebration" reached No. 1 on the Billboard Hot 100 chart on February 7, 1981, and held that position for two weeks before Dolly Parton's "9 to 5" overtook it. It remains the band's only Billboard No. 1 hit.

By late 1980, the song had also reached No. 1 on both the Billboard Dance and R&B charts. The song was featured heavily on the radio throughout the year. It has since been frequently used in weddings and parties, and is a popular anthem for sporting events, including serving as the theme song for the St. Louis Cardinals after winning the 1982 World Series. In 1981, it was commonly played by radio stations in honor of the release of US hostages from captivity in Iran. It was also an international hit, reaching No. 7 in the United Kingdom on November 29, 1980, spending 13 weeks in the chart.

Charts

Weekly charts

Year-end charts

Certifications

Dragon version

"Celebration" was covered in 1987 and released as a single by New Zealand-Australian band Dragon. It was released as the lead single from the band's ninth studio album, Bondi Road (1989). The song peaked at number 11 on the Australian Kent Music Report.

Charts

Kylie Minogue version

"Celebration" was covered by Australian singer and songwriter Kylie Minogue, who originally recorded it for her fourth studio album, Let's Get to It, but it was not included on the album's release. It later appeared on her 1992 Greatest Hits album and was released as its second single on 16 November 1992. It peaked at no. 20 on the UK Singles Chart and at no. 21 in Australia. "Celebration" has been cited many times as one of Minogue's favorite songs, and it was included on her greatest hits albums Ultimate Kylie, The Best of Kylie Minogue, and Step Back in Time: The Definitive Collection. The techno-rave mix of the track is featured on the Kylie's Non-Stop History 50+1 album. It was also Minogue's last single with PWL and Stock Aitken Waterman. The music video was filmed in Rio de Janeiro.

Formats and track listings
7-inch single
"Celebration"
"Let's Get to It" – 3:50

12-inch single
"Celebration" 
"Let's Get to It"  – 4:52

CD single
"Celebration"
"Celebration" 
"Let's Get to It"  – 4:52

Australian CD single
"Celebration"
"Celebration" 
"Too Much of a Good Thing"

Japanese CD maxi single
"Celebration"
"Celebration" 	
"Celebration" 
"Let's Get To It" 	
"Let's Get To It"

Charts

See also
List of Billboard Hot 100 number-one singles of 1981
List of Cash Box Top 100 number-one singles of 1981
List of number-one dance singles of 1980 (U.S.)
List of number-one singles of 1981 (Canada)
List of number-one singles from the 1980s (New Zealand)
List of number-one R&B singles of 1980 (U.S.)
List of post-disco artists and songs

References

1980 songs
1980 singles
1987 singles
1992 singles
De-Lite Records singles
Kool & the Gang songs
Kylie Minogue songs
Dragon (band) songs
Pete Waterman Entertainment singles
Songs written by Claydes Charles Smith
Songs written by Eumir Deodato
Songs written by Ronald Bell (musician)
Songs written by Robert "Kool" Bell
Songs written by James "J.T." Taylor
Billboard Hot 100 number-one singles
Cashbox number-one singles
RPM Top Singles number-one singles
Number-one singles in New Zealand
Post-disco songs
Songs about dancing
Songs about parties
Songs about music
RCA Records singles
United States National Recording Registry recordings